Hatefiles is a compilation album by American heavy metal band Fear Factory, released by Roadrunner Records on April 8, 2003. It contains rare, unreleased and remixed tracks. The album is notable as it contains "Terminate", the last song to be recorded with original guitarist Dino Cazares until his return to the band in 2009. Graphic designer Dave McKean's artwork is also used.

Tracks 2, 3, 4, 5 and 13 all appeared on the Australian-only release of the Linchpin EP. Track 5 also appeared on the soundtrack for the film Resident Evil, while track 13 appeared on Ozzfest: Second Stage Live. 14, 15 and 16 appeared on the Burn single from Remanufacture. Track 17 was available on the 7" vinyl-only The Gabber Mixes EP. Tracks 9 and 10 are early versions of the tracks which would later appear on Demanufacture as mixed by Colin Richardson, the album's producer. The final album mix is credited to Greg Reely. Track 11 is the same as the version that appeared on the limited edition of Obsolete, but mostly features only Gary Numan on vocals. Tracks 7 and 8 appeared on the Cars single. Track 12 is an early demo of the song (Invisible Wounds) Dark Bodies from Digimortal. Tracks 1, 6, 9, 10, 11, 12 and 18 are previously unreleased.

Track listing

Personnel

John Aguto – mixing
Duane Baron – engineer
John Bechdel – keyboards, programming
Burton C. Bell – vocals
Dino Cazares – guitar, mixing
Monte Conner – compilation, song notes
Fear Factory – producer
Rhys Fulber – keyboards, programming, producer, remixing
Caroline Greyshock – photography
Raymond Herrera – drums
Ted Jensen – mastering
Junkie XL – engineer, remixing
Tom Lord-Alge – remixing
George Marino – mastering
Dave McKean – illustrations, cover design
UE Nastasi – assembly
Thom Panunzio – producer, mixing
Mike Plotnikoff – mixing
Greg Reely – producer, mixing
Colin Richardson – producer, mixing
Technohead – remixing
David Tickle – producer
Rebecca Waterfall – design
Rick "Soldier" Will – producer, mixing
Christian Olde Wolbers – bass

References

Fear Factory albums
2003 greatest hits albums
Albums produced by Thom Panunzio
Roadrunner Records compilation albums
Albums produced by Greg Reely